András Ruják (born June 30, 1988) is a Hungarian professional basketball player for PVSK Panthers of the Nemzeti Bajnokság I/A. Ruják also played for the Hungarian national basketball team, as he was part of the roster that participated at EuroBasket 2017.

References

External links
Eurobasket.com profile
RealGM.com profile

1988 births
Living people
Atomerőmű SE players
Basketball players from Budapest
BC Körmend players
Hungarian men's basketball players
Point guards
PVSK Panthers players
Soproni KC players